, also called Shōkyū, was a Japanese era name (年号, nengō, lit. year name) after Kempō and before Jōō.  This period spanned the years from April 1219 through April 1222. The reigning emperor was Juntoku-tennō (順徳天皇).

Change of era
 1219 : The new era name was created because the previous era ended and a new one commenced in Kempo 3, on the 6th day of the 12th month of 1219.

Events of the Jōkyū era
 February 12, 1219 (Jōkyū 1, 26th day of the 1st month): Shōgun Sanetomo was assassinated on the steps of Tsurugaoka Hachiman-gū in Kamakura. The 40 years during which Minamoto no Yoritomo, Minamoto no Yoriie and Minamoto no Sanetomo were successive heads of the Kamakura shogunate was sometimes called "the period of the three shōguns." A new shōgun was not to be named for several years during which the Kamakura bureaucracy nevertheless continued to function without interruption.
 1220 (Jōkyū 2, 2nd month): The emperor visited the Iwashimizu Shrine and the Kamo Shrines.
 May 13, 1221 (Jōkyū 3, 20th day of the 4th month): In the 11th year of Juntoku-tennōs reign (順徳天皇11年), the emperor abdicated; and the succession (senso) was received by eldest son who was only 4 years old. Shortly thereafter, Emperor Chūkyō is said to have acceded to the throne (sokui). The reign of Emperor Chūkyō spans a small number of months.
 July 29, 1221 (Jōkyū 3, 9th day of the 7th month): In the 1st year of what is now considered to have been Chūkyō-tennōs reign (仲恭天皇1年), he abruptly abdicated without designating an heir; and contemporary scholars then construed that the succession (senso) was received by a grandson of former Emperor Go-Toba.
 1221 (Jōkyū 3): The Jōkyū War (Jōkyū no ran) was an armed attempt by Emperor Go-Toba and his supporters, trying unsuccessfully to take power from the Kamakura bakufu.
 January 14, 1222 (Jōkyū 3, 1st day of the 12th month): Emperor Go-Horikawa acceded to the throne (sokui).

Notes

References
 Brown, Delmer and Ichiro Ishida. (1979). The Future and the Past: a translation and study of the 'Gukanshō', an interpretative history of Japan written in 1219.  Berkeley: University of California Press. ;  OCLC 5145872
 Nussbaum, Louis-Frédéric and Käthe Roth. (2005).  Japan encyclopedia. Cambridge: Harvard University Press. ;  OCLC 58053128
 Titsingh, Isaac. (1834). Nihon Odai Ichiran; ou,  Annales des empereurs du Japon.  Paris: Royal Asiatic Society, Oriental Translation Fund of Great Britain and Ireland. OCLC 5850691
 Varley, H. Paul. (1980). A Chronicle of Gods and Sovereigns: Jinnō Shōtōki of Kitabatake Chikafusa. New York: Columbia University Press. ;  OCLC 6042764

External links
 National Diet Library, "The Japanese Calendar" -- historical overview plus illustrative images from library's collection
 New York Public Library Digital Gallery, early photograph of Shrine steps where Sanetomo was  killed

Japanese eras
1210s in Japan
1220s in Japan